Cyanopepla jalifa is a moth of the subfamily Arctiinae. It was described by Jean Baptiste Boisduval in 1870. It is found in Mexico and Honduras.

References

Cyanopepla
Moths described in 1870